Augustin Chantrel (11 November 1906 – 4 September 1956) was a French footballer who played as a halfback. He appeared for several local clubs and represented France at the 1930 World Cup and the 1928 Olympic tournament.

Early life and career
During his youth, Chantrel played for the Paris Université Club (PUC), until Paris team Red Star Olympique brought him to their squad in 1925. He won the Coupe de France in 1928 while at Red Star, and stayed at that club until 1929; he then joined CASG Paris, and then had a period at Amiens SC (1933 to 1934), followed by his return to Red Star, where he would stay until the end of his professional career in 1939. For his last season, Chantrel became a player–coach, helping former World Cup rival from Argentina Guillermo Stábile to manage Red Star, and helping the club win the Division 2 championship. Chantrel was capped 15 times for the French national team, from 1928 to 1933.

His international debut took place while he was playing for Red Star, on 11 March 1928, against Switzerland. In 1930, he was selected to the squad that travelled across the Atlantic on board the Conte Verde to play in the first ever World Cup tournament in Montevideo. Chantrel appeared in all three of France's matches. During the first half of the first match against Mexico, with the score 1–0 in favour of France, goalkeeper Alex Thépot suffered an injury after a collision with a Mexican player, and was unable to continue playing. Substitutions were not allowed at the time, and Chantrel, a halfback, replaced Thépot in goal from the 24th minute until the end of the match, which France won.

Chantrel played on the team sent to the 1928 Olympic tournament in Amsterdam, playing in France's only match, a 4–3 loss to Italy.

Chantrel is the only player in World Cup history to see action as a field player and as a goalkeeper. He is also the only field player ever to replace a goalkeeper after having started the match at a different position. Chantrel's last international match was against Germany on 19 March 1933.

Notes and references

External links
 
 

1906 births
1956 deaths
Association football midfielders
French footballers
1930 FIFA World Cup players
France international footballers
Olympic footballers of France
Footballers at the 1928 Summer Olympics
Ligue 1 players
Ligue 2 players
Red Star F.C. players
Amiens SC players
French football managers
Red Star F.C. managers